Promegaparia is a genus of parasitic flies in the family Tachinidae. There is one described species in Promegaparia, P. petiolata.

Distribution
Peru.

References

Dexiinae
Diptera of South America
Monotypic Brachycera genera
Taxa named by Charles Henry Tyler Townsend
Tachinidae genera